The Boorowa railway line is a closed railway line in New South Wales, Australia.

Construction 
The Main Southern Railway was extended through the Galong area in 1877. Residents of Burrowa (as the ultimate terminus of the branch line under discussion was then known) began agitation for their own branch line. Subsequently, in February, 1884, a Public Meeting was held in Burrowa and it was resolved to send a deputation to the Minister for Public Works to voice their feelings. By the following August, the Galong to Burrowa branch was included in a list of branch railways under consideration. On 28 October 1884, Parliament confirmed the line as part of list of lines to be constructed in the near future. But, that was where it stopped. 

Following further inquiries, it was not until 27 February 1912, that the Galong to Burrowa Authorisation Bill came before Parliament and it passed through all stages on 28 March 1912.

The first sod was turned on 15 June that year and the line opened on 10 October 1914. As from that date the station was known as Boorowa.

Passenger traffic 
The branch had three scheduled services a week, Mixed Trains running Tuesdays, Thursdays and Saturdays. In 1929, an additional railmotor service was introduced, running on Mondays, Wednesdays and Fridays. In 1937, a 4-wheel Rail-bus was introduced on Wednesdays and Thursdays, but it was discontinued by 1942.

The railmotor services were discontinued by 1949, leaving the thrice weekly Mixed train as the sole service once again.

Passenger services ceased 
Passenger services were withdrawn on 11 August 1974.

Last train and closure 
The last train to use the line ran on 23 October 1987.

A rail trail is proposed to reuse the closed line. Funding for a feasibility study has been approved by Hilltop Council.

References
 Boorowa branch - NSWrail.net

Closed regional railway lines in New South Wales
Standard gauge railways in Australia
Railway lines opened in 1914
Railway lines closed in 1974